North Gwinnett High School is a public high school outside the city limits of Suwanee, Georgia, United States.  It is part of the  district Gwinnett County Public Schools.  The school's principal is Nathan Ballantine.

History
North Gwinnett High School was established in 1958. It was built in a former cotton field between the communities of Suwanee and Sugar Hill for the purpose of consolidating the two communities' separate high schools, Suwanee High School and Sugar Hill High School. The land for the school was donated by the estate of Tom Robinson, for whom the NGHS football field is named.

In its early years, NGHS was a small school. In 1960, the school served grades 8 through 12 and there were 328 students enrolled. The eighth grade was eliminated after a new middle school was built during the 1973-1974 school year. By that year, NGHS had 606 students. The school grew dramatically in subsequent decades. Enrollment reached 1,000 for the first time in the 1988-1989 school year and has reached over 2,800. For the 2011-2012 school year, enrollment was 2,670. As of 2018-2019, enrollment is reported as 2,846 students.

North Gwinnett High School figured in Franklin v. Gwinnett County Public Schools, 503 U.S. 60 (1992), a U.S. Supreme Court case that was decided in 1992. A female student at the school accused a teacher of sexual harassment and sued the school district for monetary damages for not stopping the harassment after she complained to school authorities. The federal district court ruled that Title IX of the Education Amendments of 1972, under which she sued, did not allow for monetary damages. The appeals court affirmed that ruling, but the Supreme Court overturned that decision. The Supreme Court found that Title IX does allow for monetary damages, thus returning the student's case to lower courts.

Mentorship
Every student at NGHS is provided with a faculty mentor.  Students have "Advisement Lessons" with their mentor on Wednesdays.  Freshmen at NGHS are also given student mentors.

Awards
In 2009, North Gwinnett High School received the silver award for the Single Statewide Accountability System.  In 2010, the Department of Education named the school as one of the Advanced Placement Honors Schools.

Student life
School activities include athletics, clubs, and leadership groups such as the NGHS Beta Society, Student Council, Quiz Bowl, HOSA, TSA, Deca, FBLA, and Relay for Life. The school's football team won the 2017 State Championship Class AAAAAAA.The women's varsity soccer team won the 2019 State Championship Class AAAAAAA,

Notable alumni
 Charlie Blackmon, MLB player
 
 Lexie Brown, WNBA player
 Jared Cook, NFL player
 Mitch Hyatt, NFL player
 Ja'Wuan James, NFL player
 Kibwe Johnson, Olympic athlete (hammer throw)
Noah Lomax, Actor
 Robert Nelson, NFL player
 Austin Shepherd, NFL player
 CJ Uzomah, NFL player
 Blake Wood, MLB player

References

External links
 

Schools in Gwinnett County, Georgia
Public high schools in Georgia (U.S. state)
Educational institutions established in 1958
1958 establishments in Georgia (U.S. state)